The 1994 NFL draft was the procedure by which National Football League teams selected amateur college football players. It is officially known as the NFL Annual Player Selection Meeting. The draft was held April 24–25, 1994, at the Marriott Marquis in New York City, New York. The league also held a supplemental draft after the regular draft and before the regular season. This was the first draft in which the rounds were reduced to seven in total.

The top prospects going into the draft included quarterbacks Trent Dilfer and Heath Shuler, running back Marshall Faulk, and defensive tackle Dan Wilkinson, with The New York Times stating that those four players "rank well above the others in this draft". Wilkinson was so highly coveted that several teams expressed interest to trade up to get the first overall pick of the draft from the Cincinnati Bengals. The Bengals passed on any offers and drafted Wilkinson. Faulk and Shuler were then picked second and third by the Indianapolis Colts and the Washington Redskins, respectively. After the New England Patriots used the fourth pick to draft linebacker Willie McGinest (because they already had quarterback Drew Bledsoe, whom they selected first overall in the previous year and therefore passed on Dilfer), the Colts traded up to get the fifth pick from the Los Angeles Rams. But Indianapolis passed on Dilfer again, selecting linebacker Trev Alberts. The Colts' selections of Faulk and Alberts angered ESPN analyst Mel Kiper, Jr. on-air, who believed Indianapolis needed a quarterback in the first round. Colts general manager Bill Tobin, who signed free agent quarterback Jim Harbaugh ahead of the draft, responded by criticizing Kiper's credentials. Faulk would become a Hall of Fame inductee, while Albert's career only lasted three seasons. Dilfer was drafted sixth by the Tampa Bay Buccaneers but eventually became regarded as a journeyman. The Colts would reach the AFC Championship Game with Harbaugh in 1995, but fell to 3–13 in 1997, which led to the firing of Tobin and the drafting of longtime franchise quarterback Peyton Manning the following year.

Player selections

 

|-

|-

|-

|-

|-

Supplemental draft

Trades
In the explanations below, (D) denotes trades that took place during the 1994 Draft, while (PD) indicates trades completed pre-draft.

Round one

Round two

Round three

Round four

Round five

Round six

Round seven

Notable undrafted players

|}

Hall of Famers

 Marshall Faulk, running back from San Diego State, drafted 1st round 2nd overall by Indianapolis Colts.
Inducted: class of 2011
Larry Allen, offensive guard from Sonoma State, drafted 2nd round 46th overall by Dallas Cowboys.
Inducted: class of 2013
 Kurt Warner, quarterback from Northern Iowa, undrafted.
Inducted: class of 2017
 Kevin Mawae, offensive lineman from Louisiana State, drafted 2nd round 36th overall by Seattle Seahawks. 
Inducted: Class of 2019
 Isaac Bruce, wide receiver from Memphis, drafted 2nd round 33rd overall by Los Angeles Rams. 
Inducted: Class of 2020
 Bryant Young, defensive tackle from Notre Dame, drafted 1st round 7th overall by San Francisco 49ers. 
Inducted: Class of 2022

Notes

References

External links
 NFL.com – 1994 Draft
 databaseFootball.com – 1994 Draft
 Pro Football Hall of Fame
 
 

National Football League Draft
NFL Draft
Draft
NFL Draft
NFL Draft
American football in New York City
1990s in Manhattan
Sporting events in New York City
Sports in Manhattan